The Gilboa-Conesville Central School District is a small, rural school located in the Northern Catskill Mountains.  There are about 375 students in grades K–12 housed in one building in Gilboa, Schoharie County New York.

There are no villages nor towns within the school district.  The town of Prattsville has the only village atmosphere in the district.  Because no students live within walking distance of the school, almost all take the school bus to school.

External links
Gilboa-Conesville Central School Website

Schools in Schoharie County, New York
Public high schools in New York (state)
Public middle schools in New York (state)
Public elementary schools in New York (state)
1929 establishments in New York (state)